Vuk Đurić (born 30 September 1988) is a Serbian-born Montenegrin football midfielder.

He had played with Serbian club FK Sloboda Užice, Montenegrin First League club FK Zeta and back in Serbia with FK Srem.

He was part of the Montenegrin U-21 team.

References

External sources
 Profile at Srbijafudbal
 Vuk Đurić Stats at Utakmica.rs

1988 births
Living people
People from Bajina Bašta
Association football midfielders
Serbia and Montenegro footballers
Montenegrin footballers
Montenegro under-21 international footballers
FK Sloboda Užice players
FK Zeta players
FK Srem players
FK Hajduk Kula players
FK Voždovac players
FK Sinđelić Beograd players
FK Jedinstvo Užice players
Montenegrin First League players
Serbian SuperLiga players
Serbian First League players